Matea Čiča (born 30 September 1985) is a Croatian badminton player.

Achievements

BWF International Challenge/Series 
Women's doubles

Mixed doubles

  BWF International Challenge tournament
  BWF International Series tournament
  BWF Future Series tournament

References

External links 
 

1985 births
Living people
Sportspeople from Zagreb
Croatian female badminton players